Karnataka is a state in India with rich archaeological and ecological heritage.

Karnataka state has 5 Tiger Reserves, 30 wildlife sanctuaries and 15 conservation reserves.

Following is the list of Protected Areas (PAs) for Birds in Karnataka.

Bird sanctuaries 
Ranganathittu Bird Sanctuary, Mandya district.
 Adichunchanagiri Peacock Sanctuary, Mandya district.
Attiveri Bird Sanctuary, Uttara Kannada & Dharwad district.
Gudavi Bird Sanctuary, Shimoga district.
 Ramadevarabetta Vulture Sanctuary, Ramanagara district.
Mandagadde Bird Sanctuary in Shimoga district 11

Bird conservation reserves 
Bankapura Peacock Conservation Reserve, Haveri district.
 Hornbill Conservation Reserve, Dandeli, Uttara Kannada district.
Magadi Kere Conservation Reserve, Gadag district.
 Ankasamudra Bird Conservation Reserve, Hagari Bommanahalli taluk, Bellary district.

References 
11. http://englishkannada.com/birds-name-in-kannada
Bird sanctuaries of India